Daniel Gould Fowle (March 3, 1831April 7, 1891) was the 46th governor of the U.S. state of North Carolina from 1889 until his death in 1891. He had served as a state superior court judge from 1865 to 1867.

Fowle was the first governor to live in the governor's official residence, and ultImately died  According to popular legend, the ghost of Gov. Fowle has haunted the North Carolina Executive Mansion from time to time.

Early life
Fowle was born in Washington, North Carolina to Samuel and Martha March Fowle. Samuel Fowle had moved to North Carolina from Massachusetts in 1815 and was a wealthy merchant. Daniel Fowle attended Bingham Academy, where he finished first in his class, and Princeton University. Upon graduating from Princeton in 1851 he studied law at Richmond Hill Law School and began a practice in Raleigh, North Carolina.

Civil War
Fowle was opposed to secession, but he still volunteered as a private in the North Carolina Militia. He was soon appointed major in the commissary branch. He resigned that post and helped to raise the 31st North Carolina Infantry regiment. On September 9, 1861, Fowle was appointed lieutenant colonel of the regiment. In February 1862, Fowle and the 31st NC were captured on Roanoke Island. He was paroled two weeks later. In September 1862, he was defeated in the election for colonel of the regiment and left the Confederate States Army. In October, he was elected to the state legislature representing Wake County, North Carolina. In March 1863, Governor Zebulon B. Vance appointed Fowle adjutant general of North Carolina with the rank of major general. Fowle resigned the post in the fall of 1863 after a disagreement with Vance. Fowle was reelected to the legislature in 1864.

Post-War
Fowle returned to his law practice and made a name for himself in the state Democratic Party. In 1868, he was elected as the state chairman of the Democratic Party. In 1880 he was defeated in the gubernatorial election and in 1884 he lost a race for Congress.

Governor
Fowle was nominated by the "liberal" faction of the Democratic Party in 1888 and he won the general election. As he was widowed when elected, his daughter Helen Whitaker Fowle Knight served as his first lady. He created a state railroad commission to protect farmers and advocated for education for women. He died while in office and is buried in Oakwood Cemetery in Raleigh.

References

External links
D.G. Fowle brief profile

1831 births
1891 deaths
Adjutants General of North Carolina
Daniel
Democratic Party governors of North Carolina
North Carolina state court judges
Burials at Historic Oakwood Cemetery
People of North Carolina in the American Civil War
Princeton University alumni
People from Washington, North Carolina